Camargue equitation is the traditional style of working riding of the  herders of the Camargue region of southern France.

See also
 List of equestrian sports

References 

Camargue
Riding techniques and movements